Machhegaun (Sanskrit: मच्छेगाऊं) is a village and former Village Development Committee that is now part of Chandragiri Municipality in Kathmandu District in Province No. 3 of central Nepal. At the time of the 1991 Nepal census it had a population of 2,871 .

Current Situation
There has been drastic changes in size of population, roads, schools and houses while analyzing the history and the year 2017. Newars and Newari used to be a predominant people, culture and language in this place but it has changed recently with the increasing number of local immigrants with other caste and cultures. Random land plotting and town planning has rapidly increased affecting more people to move into this beautiful place. Due to which, agricultural land has been severely affected. Although Kathmandu has been facing the problem of drinking water scarcity and environmental pollution, this place has faced very little because of effective and active management program supported by Nepal government and UNDP project for water management and environmental protection from 2010.

Buddha Statue built in 2011, is now a landmark in Machhegaun attracting thousands of people to visit every year. Bricks and stone paved staircase has been developed since the statue being established to facilitate the pilgrimage. The view from the top of the hill where the site has been developed has views of Kathmandu Valley.

History
Its name came from Machhenarayan, an avatar of god Vishnu. It is said that during ancient time, Manu found a small fish about to die while he was having a bath in a river. He brought the fish to his home and put it into a small pot of water. Next day, the fish grew in its size amazingly and was no longer fit in the small pot. So he put the fish in a pond just to find next day that the fish had grown larger and no longer fit in the pond as well. Knowing that this fish is no ordinary fish, Manu bowed with respect and asked to show the fish who he was. Then god Vishnu emerged from the mouth of the fish. To remember this event, Manu established Machhenarayan temple in the center of the pond.

A mela (fair), named MangalMas, is organized every three years in Machhegaun for a month, mostly during a month from April to July. During this month god Vishnu is worshiped all over the country.

Location
The village is located west of Kirtipur.
It is around 7–8 km far from the center of Kathmandu city.

References

Populated places in Kathmandu District